Trevor Colin Mallard (born 17 June 1954) is a New Zealand politician. He currently serves as Ambassador of New Zealand to Ireland since 2023. He was a Member of Parliament from 1984 to 1990 and again from 1993 to 2022. He served as Speaker of the New Zealand House of Representatives from 2017 until 2022. 

Mallard was a Cabinet minister in the Fifth Labour Government of New Zealand (1999 to 2008). For six years, he was Minister of Education and Minister of State Services and held additional appointments as Minister for the Environment, Minister of Labour, Minister of Broadcasting, Minister for State Owned Enterprises, Minister for Sport and Recreation and Associate Minister of Finance. He has represented the electorates of Hamilton West, Pencarrow and Hutt South, and was a list member of Parliament between 2017 and 2022.

Mallard's election as the Speaker in 2017 and 2020 completed his parliamentary career. His move into a presiding officer role was likened to "the poacher turned gamekeeper." Mallard had had a reputation as an "attack dog" and "political battler" (he was once convicted of fighting in a public place after punching National MP Tau Henare at Parliament). His speakership was remarked on for its contribution to parliamentary culture change, including promoting a more family-friendly environment and removing the requirement for male MPs to wear ties. However, some of Mallard's comments and actions attracted criticism including in relation to the 2022 Wellington protests.

In February 2023, Mallard took up the role of New Zealand ambassador to Ireland.

Education and teaching career
Mallard was born in Wellington, and attended Onslow College. After gaining a Bachelor of Commerce and Administration degree from Victoria University of Wellington in 1974, he trained as a teacher at the Wellington College of Education, gaining a Diploma in Teaching in 1976. He subsequently held a number of teaching jobs in Wellington and the King Country. 

While teaching, Mallard became involved in the Post Primary Teachers' Association (PPTA), the national secondary school teachers' union. He was secretary of the PPTA's King Country branch from 1979 to 1984. In 1984, he gained a Diploma in Continuing Education from the University of Waikato.

Labour Party activism
Mallard joined the Labour Party in 1972, while still at university. In 1977 Mallard was arrested in Parliament during an anti-SIS bill protest, later appearing in court and the supreme court. He was also arrested during the 1981 Springbok protests. In 1983 he contested the Labour nomination for the new Tongariro electorate but was unsuccessful, losing to Noel Scott.

Member of Parliament

Fourth Labour Government, 1984–1990
He held a number of internal party positions until the election of 1984 when he defeated Mike Minogue to become the member of Parliament for Hamilton West. In his first term of Parliament, the Labour Party formed a new government and Mallard served as a member off the Justice and Law Reform committee and Regulations Review committee.

Mallard was re-elected in the 1987 election and the Labour government won a second term. Mallard was appointed junior government whip from 1987 to 1990, when he became senior whip. He lost his seat in the election of 1990.

Fourth National Government, 1993–1999
Returning to the Wellington area, he contested the seat of Pencarrow in the 1993 election and was successful. The electorate was renamed Hutt South in 1996, and Mallard retained the seat until 2017 when he opted to become a list MP in a bid to become the Speaker of the House.

As an opposition member of Parliament in the 1990s, Mallard was reappointed to the Justice and Law Reform committee (1993–1994) and appointed to the Government Administration committee (1993–1999). Under Helen Clark's leadership, Mallard was a senior member of the Labour Party. Michael Cullen described him as a member of Clark's inner circle which also included Pete Hodgson, Steve Maharey, Phil Goff and Annette King. He held spokesperson roles in portfolios he would later have ministerial responsibility for, including sport, state services and education.

Fifth Labour Government, 1999–2008

When Labour won the 1999 election, Mallard was appointed to Cabinet. He became Minister of Education, Minister of State Services, and Minister for Sport and Recreation. In connection with his Education role, he also became Minister Responsible for the Education Review Office, and in connection with his Sport role, he also became Minister for the America's Cup (New Zealand held the America's Cup at the time). In 2004, Mallard also became Co-ordinating Minister for Race Relations, and Minister of Energy.

In September 2006, Mallard was implicated in the resignation of National Party leader Don Brash after interjecting with an allegation in the House that Brash had engaged in an extramarital affair.

In an October 2007 cabinet reshuffle, he was reassigned to be the Minister for the Environment, the Minister of Labour, the Minister of Broadcasting, the Minister for State Owned Enterprises and the Associate Minister of Finance.

In October 2007, Mallard punched National Party MP Tau Henare in a scuffle that took place outside the debating chambers. It is speculated that this was a result of comments Henare made regarding a new relationship Mallard had formed. Mallard quickly apologised for his part in the altercation. He also publicly revealed that the woman with whom he had entered a new relationship was former world champion rower Brenda Lawson. Police declined to investigate but Graham McCready launched a private prosecution. Mallard pleaded guilty to fighting in a public place and agreed to pay $500 to the Salvation Army's Bridge drug and alcohol programme.

In May 2008, Mallard was warned by New Zealand's Chief Electoral Officer Robert Peden that signage on his electorate vehicle breached provisions of the controversial Electoral Finance Act and ordered him to update the signage to include an authorisation from party officials. However, the Chief Electoral Officer did not refer the matter to the New Zealand Police to prosecute as the matter was considered inconsequential.

Minister of Education 
Mallard's handling of the education portfolio was strongly criticised by teachers' unions, including the PPTA. In his first term as minister, he was strongly criticised by teachers during a long-running strike action over salaries.

In his second term, he was criticised for a program of school closures, that involved almost 90 schools across the country. The program was eventually stopped after it faced heavy criticism from parents and teachers.

Minister of Sport and Recreation 
In April 2002, Mallard made crude comments about inserting beer bottles into "uncomfortable places" of International Rugby Board chairman Vernon Pugh and Australian Rugby boss John O'Neill during a radio interview about following the withdrawal of co-hosting rights for the 2003 Rugby World Cup. He later apologised saying he mixed up his passion for rugby with his role as Minister of Sport.

Minister of State Owned Enterprises 
In 2006, Mallard announced that the government would introduce a policy that encouraged state-owned enterprises (SOEs) to expand into new business areas and diversify in order to build wealth for the country.

In 2007, Mallard said that the government was likely to be more stringent on state-owned enterprises in relation to social responsibility. Mallard explained that social responsibility is one of the core functions of SOEs but not enough was being done. The announcement was made following a number of incidents by SOEs, including a power disconnection by Mercury Energy that resulted in the death of Folole Muliaga, an individual who relied on an oxygen machine.

Minister of Labour 
In 2008, Mallard implemented a new tool to help small businesses manage hazards. The goal of the project was to improve workplace health and safety.

Minister of Broadcasting 
In July 2008, Mallard was critical of a TVNZ report into an assault by sports broadcaster Tony Veitch, saying that the report lacked key details, such as not mentioning that an assault took place.

Fifth National Government, 2008–2017
Returning to opposition after the ascent of the Fifth National Government led by John Key in 2008, Mallard was Labour spokesperson for a range of portfolios including animal welfare (2014–2017), internal affairs (2013–2015) and education and labour (2008–2011). He was shadow leader of the House from 2011 to 2013 and was elected an assistant Speaker of the House in 2014. 

In February 2012, Mallard was accused of ticket scalping on Trade Me when he sold four tickets to the Homegrown music festival for a $246 profit. As Minister of Economic Development in 2006, Mallard had initiated legislation, the Major Events Management Act 2007, prohibiting ticket scalping for major events (although Homegrown wasn't classified as a "major event" so wasn't covered). He later offered to refund the money he received for the tickets.

In May 2012, Mallard and fellow Labour MP Andrew Little were sued by National MP and Minister for the Accident Compensation Corporation (ACC) Judith Collins for defamation over comments they made on the public broadcaster Radio New Zealand linking her to the leak of an e-mail from Michelle Boag about an ACC privacy breach. After spending weeks avoiding Collins' legal team, Mallard received Collins' legal papers from a woman posing as a constituent. The case was settled by the parties involved following a High Court hearing in November 2012.

In December 2019, former Auditor-General Martin Matthews claimed that Mallard and other members of the Officers of Parliament committee, including then-Speaker David Carter, had pressured him to resign prior to the release of a critical report by Sir Martin Wevers into Matthews' handling of a NZ$725,000 fraud perpetrated by Ministry of Transport employee Joanne Harrison. At the time, Matthews had served as the head of the Ministry of Transport. Wevers' report ruled that Matthews was unsuitable for the position of Auditor-General since he had failed to detect Harrison's fraud earlier. Matthews disputed the report, alleging that it was full of errors and did not meet the threshold for removing Officers of Parliament. Matthews claimed that Mallard and his fellow MPs had denied him natural justice by not allowing him to respond to alleged inaccuracies in Wevers' report.

Sixth Labour Government, 2017–2022

Following the formation of a Labour-led coalition government with New Zealand First and the Green parties in October 2017, Mallard was elected as Speaker of the House on 7 November following some contention from the opposition National Party over whether several of the new MPs had been sworn in. He also served as Chairperson of several committees including the Business and Officers of Parliament select committees, and the Parliamentary Services Commission.

In November 2017, Mallard announced that the New Zealand Parliament would be becoming more "baby friendly" while posing for a photo with fellow Labour MP Willow-Jean Prime's baby Heeni. Such policies have included opening an atrium near the parliamentary chamber accessible to MPs' children, giving carers and spouses the same security clearances as MPs, opening the Parliamentary swimming pool to the families of MPs and staff, updating the family room to have baby-feeding and changing facilities, and a proposed play area on Parliament's lawn. On 22 August 2019, Mallard attracted media attention in New Zealand and abroad when he fed Labour MP Tāmati Coffey's infant son  Tūtānekai Smith-Coffey during a parliamentary debate.

During the 2020 New Zealand general election, Mallard was re-elected to Parliament on the Labour Party list. When the new Parliament assembled on 25 November, he was re-elected as Speaker without opposition.

After canvassing the views of Members of Parliament in late 2020, Speaker Mallard decided that Parliament would not revise its business attire dress code which required male Members to wear a jacket and tie, as there was "very little support for a change," though he "personally loathed" ties. On 9 February 2021, Mallard ejected Māori Party Co-Leader Rawiri Waititi from parliamentary proceedings after he defied Parliament's business attire rule by wearing a Māori hei tiki neck tie instead of a formal necktie. On 10 February, Mallard announced that ties were no longer compulsory in Parliament following a Standing Orders Committee meeting where the majority voted in favour of the Māori Party's submission calling for the elimination of neckties as part of Parliament's business attire.

Rape allegation remarks, 2019–2020 
In late January 2020, Mallard was sued by a parliamentary staff member who alleged that the Speaker had defamed him by claiming in May 2019 that a rapist was working at Parliament. The staff member, who described these remarks as defamatory and untrue, hired Matthew McClelland QC and sought NZ$400,000 in general damages, NZ$50,000 in punitive damages and court costs. In response, Mallard hired the services of a Queen's Counsel from Kensington Swan.

On 8 December 2020, Mallard apologised to the staff member and it was announced that both parties considered the matter closed. On 11 December, The New Zealand Herald and Stuff reported that the matter had cost public funds NZ$333,000 (including an NZ$185,000 ex-gratia payment to the former staff member and more than $175,000 on legal fees). In response, National Party leader Judith Collins stated that her party had lost confidence in Mallard as Speaker of the House while the New Zealand Taxpayers' Union called on Mallard to reimburse taxpayers.

On 16 December 2020, Mallard appeared before the Governance and Administration Select Committee where he apologised for calling the former staff member a rapist. It was reported that the staff member was pursuing an employment case against the Parliamentary Service, that had cost NZ$37,500 in legal fees so far. A member of the Taxpayers' Union dressed in a pig's mascot costume also held a mock invoice during the proceedings before being asked to leave due to an objection by Labour MP Duncan Webb.

On 9 February 2021, the National Party unsuccessfully attempted to move a motion of no confidence in Speaker Mallard over the incident. In early May 2021, Mallard drew controversy and media attention when he used parliamentary privilege to claim that the parliamentary staff member whom he had falsely accused of rape committed sexual assault during an exchange with National MPs Chris Bishop and Michael Woodhouse. Prime Minister Ardern criticised Mallard's actions as "totally inappropriate" but rejected calls by the National and ACT parties to dismiss him from his position as Speaker.

2022 Wellington protests 

In mid–February 2022 a large group of mostly anti-mandate, COVID denialist and anti-vaccine protesters established a makeshift camp outside the New Zealand Parliament to protest the Government's COVID-19 mitigation and vaccination policies. As Speaker of the House, Mallard was unable to order the protestors to be dispersed by force, so instead responded to their refusal to vacate Parliament's grounds by turning sprinklers on full and setting up loud speakers playing copyrighted music and pro-vaccination messages. Despite consulting local residents before he did so (to their approval), Mallard was criticised for his actions by the opposition National and ACT parties. National's COVID-19 spokesperson Chris Bishop criticised Mallard for antagonising the protesters further while ACT leader David Seymour remarked that Mallard "seems to be acting like a kid in a very adult situation."

On 16 February, the National Party said that it intended to lodge a motion of no confidence in Mallard over his handling of the protests and occupation in Wellington.

In early May 2022, Mallard, in his capacity as custodian of the parliamentary grounds, approved Parliament Security's issuing of 151 trespass notices against individuals who had participated in the Wellington anti-vaccine mandate protest. Five of these trespass notices were issued to former Members of Parliament; namely former National MP Matt King, New Zealand First leader Winston Peters, former ACT leader Rodney Hide, former Māori Party co-leader Marama Fox, and former NZ First list MP Darroch Ball. Following Peters' threat to seek a judicial review of the trespass notices and media coverage, Mallard withdrew the trespass notices against the five former MPs. In response to the trespass notices against the former MPs, the National and ACT parties renewed their calls for Mallard to be removed as Speaker of the House. Attorney General David Parker welcomed the withdrawal of the trespass notices against the MPs. Prime Minister Jacinda Ardern rejected calls to remove Mallard as Speaker and defended his decision to issue the trespass notices.

Resignation 
On 13 June 2022, Ardern confirmed that Mallard would resign from his position as Speaker of the House in mid-August 2022 to take up a diplomatic post in Europe. The Prime Minister also designated fellow Labour MP and Deputy Speaker Adrian Rurawhe as his successor. His resignation, along with that of Immigration and Broadcasting Minister Kris Faafoi, triggered a cabinet reshuffle within the Labour Government. Mallard's resignation announcement followed renewed criticism by the opposition National, Māori, and ACT parties over his decision to issue trespass notices against five former MPs.

On 24 August 2022, Mallard's resignation as Speaker of the House took effect. The day before, Foreign Minister Nanaia Mahuta formally announced his appointment as the second resident ambassador of New Zealand to Ireland, which he is due to assume in January 2023. Fellow Labour MP and Deputy Speaker Adrian Rurawhe was elected as the new Speaker of the House. During speeches following Rurawhe's election, former Labour MP Gaurav Sharma used parliamentary privilege to accuse Mallard of ignoring his concerns about bullying in Parliament and refusing to provide legal support for his case. Sharma also alleged that Mallard had informed the Labour Whips office about Sharma's complaint against the party and whips. Mallard denied Sharma's allegations.

Mallard gave his valedictory speech to Parliament on 20 October 2022, and his resignation as a list MP took effect at the end of that day.

Diplomatic career
In mid October 2022, Newshub reported that Mallard's new position as New Zealand Ambassador to Ireland had a salary between NZ$180,000 and NZ$250,000. In addition, Mallard was entitled to accommodation and two trips home over the three-year appointment. In response, ACT Party leader David Seymour criticised Mallard's diplomatic appointment as an example of "bad behaviour" being rewarded.

Personal life
Mallard announced his separation from wife Stephanie in June 2007 after 33 years of marriage. He has three children, one of whom is a Black Fern, Beth Mallard. On 29 December 2014, Mallard married journalist Jane Clifton. He is interested in outdoor recreation, including rugby and mountain biking.

See also
 List of longest-serving members of the New Zealand Parliament

References

External links

Labour Party profile for Trevor Mallard
Parliamentary profile

|-

|-

|-

|-

|-

|-

|-

|-

|-

|-

1954 births
Members of the Cabinet of New Zealand
Members of the New Zealand House of Representatives
New Zealand Labour Party MPs
New Zealand MPs for Hutt Valley electorates
New Zealand MPs for North Island electorates
Victoria University of Wellington alumni
People educated at Onslow College
New Zealand education ministers
Environment ministers of New Zealand
Living people
Unsuccessful candidates in the 1990 New Zealand general election
21st-century New Zealand politicians
Candidates in the 2017 New Zealand general election
New Zealand list MPs
Speakers of the New Zealand House of Representatives
Ambassadors of New Zealand to Ireland
Post Primary Teachers' Association people
Candidates in the 2020 New Zealand general election